There are several public holidays in Azerbaijan. Public holidays were regulated in the constitution of the Azerbaijan SSR for the first time on 19 May 1921. They are now regulated by the Constitution of Azerbaijan.

Holidays

Main holidays

Other observances
National days in Azerbaijan that are working days follows:
 30 January – Day of Azerbaijani customs
 2 February  – Day of Youth in Azerbaijan
 11 February – Day of Revenue Service
 26 February – Khojaly massacre commemoration day
 5 March  – Day of Physical Culture and Sport
 23 March – Day of the Ministry of Environment and Natural Resources 
 28 March – Day of National Security
 10 April – Day of the builder
 10 May – Flower Festival 
 2 June  – Day of Civil Aviation
 5 June  – Day of Reclamation
 18 June – Human Rights Day
 20 June – Day of the gas sector 
 2 July – Day of Azerbaijani Police
 9 July – Day of the employees of the diplomatic service
 22 July – National Press Day in Azerbaijan
 1 August – Day of Azerbaijani language and alphabet.
 2 August –  National Day of Azerbaijani cinema
 15 September – Day of Knowledge
 18 September – Day of National Music
 20 September – Day of Azerbaijani Oil / Oil Workers' Day
 27 September – Memorial Day
 1 October – Day of prosecutors in Azerbaijan 
 13 October – Day of Azerbaijani Railway
 18 October – Independence Restoration Day
 6 November – Day of Baku Metro Employees
 12 November – Constitution Day
 17 November – National Revival Day
 22 November – Day of Justice of Azerbaijan
 6 December – Day of the Ministry of Communications and Information Technologies of Azerbaijan
 12 December – Memorial Day of Heydar Aliyev
 16 December – Day of Azerbaijani Ministry of Emergency Situations

Religious days
Only the holidays of Ramadan and Qurban remain as non-working religious days in Azerbaijan as the country is highly secular and irreligious. The religious population of the country, mainly in Nardaran and a number of other villages and regions celebrate the Day of Ashura, a Shia mourning day in the Islamic calendar. Religious minorities of the country – mainly Orthodox Christians and Jews - also celebrate notable religious days of their faith. Despite the fact that the holiday Novruz takes its roots from the religion of Zoroastrianism, almost all Azerbaijanis celebrates it as a holiday of spring.

References

External links
 Holidays of Azerbaijan 

 
Azerbaijani culture
Society of Azerbaijan
Azerbaijan
Holidays